Knattspyrnufélagið Augnablik, commonly known as Augnablik, is a sports club in Kópavogur, Iceland. It was founded in 1981 by former Breiðablik players.

Football

Men's football
As of 2020, Augnablik's men's team plays in 3. deild karla.

Women's football
In 2018, Augnablik's women's team placed first in 2. deild kvenna and won promotion to 1. deild kvenna.

Trophies and achievements
2. deild kvenna (1):
2018

Basketball

During the 2000–2001 season, Augnablik men's basketball team finish fourth and last in 2. deild karla group B2. In 2012, it won the 2. deild karla championship after going 16–1 during the regular season and got promoted to the second-tier 1. deild karla for the 2012–2013 season. The club was relegated in 2014 after two seasons in 1. deild. The club has not fielded a team since finishing 7th in 2. deild in 2014–2015.

Trophies and achievements
2. deild karla (1):
2011–12

External links
 KKÍ: Augnablik – kki.is

References

Basketball teams in Iceland
Football clubs in Iceland
Multi-sport clubs in Iceland